Josep Maria Guix Ferreres (December 19, 1927 – June 28, 2009) was a Catalan, Roman Catholic Bishop of the Roman Catholic Diocese of Vic.

Guix Ferreres was ordained on May 31, 1952, to the Roman Catholic priesthood, for the Roman Catholic Archdiocese of Barcelona. Pope Paul VI appointed him auxiliary bishop of the Barcelona Archdiocese on October 22, 1968, and he was ordained bishop on December 19, 1968. On June 20, 1983, Pope John Paul II appointed him Bishop on the Diocese of Vic. He retired on June 13, 2003.

Notes

1927 births
2009 deaths
Bishops from Catalonia
20th-century Roman Catholic bishops in Spain
21st-century Roman Catholic bishops in Spain
Bishops of Vic